Makemake (minor-planet designation 136472 Makemake) is a dwarf planet and the second-largest of what are known as the classical population of Kuiper belt objects, with a diameter approximately that of Saturn's moon Iapetus, or 60% that of Pluto. It has one known satellite.

Makemake was discovered on March 31, 2005 by a team led by Michael E. Brown, and announced on July 29, 2005. In July 2008, it was named after Makemake, a creator god in the Rapa Nui mythology  of Easter Island, under the expectation by the International Astronomical Union (IAU) that it would prove to be a dwarf planet.

History

Discovery
Makemake was discovered on March 31, 2005, by a team at the Palomar Observatory, led by Michael E. Brown, and was announced to the public on July 29, 2005. The team had planned to delay announcing their discoveries of the bright objects Makemake and  until further observations and calculations were complete, but announced them both on July 29 when the discovery of another large object they had been tracking, was controversially announced on July 27 by a different team in Spain.

The earliest known precovery observations of Makemake have been found in photographic plates of the Palomar Observatory's Digitized Sky Survey from January 29, 1955 to May 1, 1998.

Despite its relative brightness (a fifth as bright as Pluto), Makemake was not discovered until after many much fainter Kuiper belt objects. Most searches for minor planets are conducted relatively close to the ecliptic (the region of the sky that the Sun, Moon and planets appear to lie in, as seen from Earth), due to the greater likelihood of finding objects there. It probably escaped detection during the earlier surveys due to its relatively high orbital inclination, and the fact that it was at its farthest distance from the ecliptic at the time of its discovery, in the northern constellation of Coma Berenices.

Makemake is the brightest trans-Neptunian object after Pluto, with an apparent magnitude of 16.2 in late 1930, it is theoretically bright enough to have been discovered by Clyde Tombaugh, whose search for trans-Neptunian objects was sensitive to objects up to magnitude 17. Indeed, in 1934 Tombaugh reported that there were no other planets out to a magnitude of 16.5 and an inclination of 17 degrees, or of greater inclination but within 50 degrees of either node.
And Makemake was there: At the time of Tombaugh's survey (1930–1943), Makemake varied from 5.5 to 13.2 degrees from the ecliptic, moving across Auriga, starting near the northwest corner of Taurus and cutting across a corner of Gemini. The starting position, however, was very close to the galactic anticenter, and Makemake would have been almost impossible to find against the dense background of stars. Tombaugh continued searching for thirteen years after his discovery of Pluto (and Makemake, though growing dimmer, was still magnitude 16.6 in early 1943, the last year of his search), but by then he was searching higher latitudes and did not find any more objects orbiting beyond Neptune.

Name and symbol 
The provisional designation  was given to Makemake when the discovery was made public. Before that, the discovery team used the codename "Easterbunny" for the object, because of its discovery shortly after Easter.

In July 2008, in accordance with IAU rules for classical Kuiper belt objects,  was given the name of a creator deity. The name of Makemake, the creator of humanity and god of fertility in the myths of the Rapa Nui, the native people of Easter Island, was chosen in part to preserve the object's connection with Easter.

Planetary symbols are no longer much used in astronomy. A Makemake symbol is included in Unicode as U+1F77C: it is mostly used by astrologers, but has also been used by NASA. The symbol was designed by Denis Moskowitz and John T. Whelan; it is a traditional petroglyph of Makemake's face stylized to resemble an 'M'. The commercial Solar Fire astrology software uses an alternative symbol, a crossed variant of a symbol created by astrologer Henry Seltzer for his commercial software.

Orbit and classification 

Makemake follows an orbit very similar to that of : highly inclined at 29° and a moderate eccentricity of about 0.16. But still, Makemake's orbit is slightly farther from the Sun in terms of both the semi-major axis and perihelion. Its orbital period is 306 years, more than Pluto's 248 years and Haumea's 283 years. Both Makemake and Haumea are currently far from the ecliptic (at an angular distance of almost 29°). Makemake will reach its aphelion in 2033, whereas Haumea passed its aphelion in early 1992.

Makemake is a classical Kuiper belt object (KBO), which means its orbit lies far enough from Neptune to remain stable over the age of the Solar System. Unlike plutinos, which can cross Neptune's orbit due to their 2:3 resonance with the planet, the classical objects have perihelia further from the Sun, free from Neptune's perturbation. Such objects have relatively low eccentricities (e below 0.2) and orbit the Sun in much the same way the planets do. Makemake, however, is a member of the "dynamically hot" class of classical KBOs, meaning that it has a high inclination compared to others in its population. Makemake is, probably coincidentally, near the 13:7 resonance with Neptune.

Physical characteristics

Brightness, size, and rotation 

Makemake is currently visually the second-brightest Kuiper belt object after Pluto, having a March opposition apparent magnitude of 17.0 it will pass from its present constellation Coma Berenices to Boötes in December 2027. It is bright enough to be visible using a high-end amateur telescope.

Combining the detection in infrared by the Spitzer Space Telescope and Herschel Space Telescope with the similarities of spectrum with Pluto yielded an estimated diameter from 1,360 to 1,480 km. However, the occultation data was later reanalyzed, leading to an estimate of  without a pole-orientation constraint. Makemake was the fourth dwarf planet recognized, because it has a bright V-band absolute magnitude of 0.05.

The rotation period of Makemake is estimated at 22.83 hours. A rotation period of 7.77 hours published in 2009 later turned out to be an alias of the actual rotation period. The possibility of this had been mentioned in the 2009 study, and the data from that study agrees well with the 22.83-hour period. This rotation period is relatively long for a dwarf planet. Part of this may be due to tidal acceleration from Makemake's satellite. It has been suggested that a second large, undiscovered satellite might better explain the dwarf planet's unusually long rotation.

Makemake's lightcurve amplitude is small, only 0.03 mag. This was thought to be due to Makemake currently being viewed pole on from Earth; however, S/2015 (136472) 1's orbital plane (which is probably orbiting with little inclination relative to Makemake's equator due to tidal effects) is edge-on from Earth, implying that Makemake is really being viewed equator-on.

Spectra and surface 

Like Pluto, Makemake appears red in the visible spectrum, and significantly redder than the surface of Eris (see colour comparison of TNOs). The near-infrared spectrum is marked by the presence of the broad methane (CH4) absorption bands. Methane is observed also on Pluto and Eris, but its spectral signature is much weaker.

Spectral analysis of Makemake's surface revealed that methane must be present in the form of large grains at least one centimetre in size. In addition to methane, large amounts of ethane and tholins as well as smaller amounts of ethylene, acetylene and high-mass alkanes (like propane) may be present, most likely created by photolysis of methane by solar radiation. The tholins are probably responsible for the red color of the visible spectrum. Although evidence exists for the presence of nitrogen ice on its surface, at least mixed with other ices, there is nowhere near the same level of nitrogen as on Pluto and Triton, where it composes more than 98 percent of the crust. The relative lack of nitrogen ice suggests that its supply of nitrogen has somehow been depleted over the age of the Solar System.

The far-infrared (24–70 μm) and submillimeter (70–500 μm) photometry performed by Spitzer and Herschel telescopes revealed that the surface of Makemake is not homogeneous. Although the majority of it is covered by nitrogen and methane ices, where the albedo ranges from 78 to 90%, there are small patches of dark terrain whose albedo is only 2 to 12%, and that make up 3 to 7% of the surface. These studies were made before S/2015 (136472) 1 was discovered; thus, these small dark patches may actually have been the dark surface of the satellite rather than any actual surface features on Makemake.

However, some experiments have refuted these studies. Spectroscopic studies, collected from 2005 to 2008 using the William Herschel Telescope (La Palma, Spain) were analyzed together with other spectra in the literature, as of 2014. They show some degree of variation in the spectral slope, which would be associated with different abundance of the complex organic materials, byproduct of the irradiation of the ices present on the surface of Makemake. However, the relative ratio of the two dominant icy species, methane and nitrogen, remains quite stable on the surface revealing a low degree of inhomogeneity in the ice component. These results have been recently confirmed when the Telescopio Nazionale Galileo acquired new visible and near infra-red spectra for Makemake, between 2006 and 2013, that covered nearly 80% of its surface; this study found that the variation in the spectra were negligible, suggesting that Makemake's surface may indeed be homogenous. Based on optical observations conducted between 2006 and 2017, Hromakina et al. concluded that Makemake's lightcurve was likely due to heterogeneities across its surface, but that the variations (of the order of 3%) were too small to have been detected spectroscopically.

Atmosphere 
Makemake was expected to have an atmosphere similar to that of Pluto but with a lower surface pressure. However, on 23 April 2011 Makemake passed in front of an 18th-magnitude star and abruptly blocked its light. The results showed that Makemake presently lacks a substantial atmosphere and placed an upper limit of 4–12 nanobar on the pressure at its surface.

The presence of methane and possibly nitrogen suggests that Makemake could have a transient atmosphere similar to that of Pluto near its perihelion. Nitrogen, if present, will be the dominant component of it. The existence of an atmosphere also provides a natural explanation for the nitrogen depletion: because the gravity of Makemake is weaker than that of Pluto, Eris and Triton, a large amount of nitrogen was probably lost via atmospheric escape; methane is lighter than nitrogen, but has significantly lower vapor pressure at temperatures prevalent at the surface of Makemake (32–36 K), which hinders its escape; the result of this process is a higher relative abundance of methane. However, studies of Pluto's atmosphere by New Horizons suggest that methane, not nitrogen, is the dominant escaping gas, suggesting that the reasons for Makemake's absence of nitrogen may be more complicated.

Satellite 

Makemake has a single discovered moon, S/2015 (136472) 1 and nicknamed MK2.

Exploration

Makemake was observed from afar by the New Horizons spacecraft in October 2007 and January 2017, from distances of 52 AU and 70 AU, respectively. The spacecraft's outbound trajectory permitted observations of Makemake at high phase angles that are otherwise unobtainable from Earth, enabling the determination of the light scattering properties and phase curve behavior of Makemake's surface. 

It has been calculated that a flyby mission to Makemake could take just over 16 years using a Jupiter gravity assist, based on a launch date of 21 August 2024 or 24 August 2036. Makemake would be approximately 52 AU from the Sun when the spacecraft arrives.

See also 
 Astronomical naming conventions
 Clearing the neighbourhood
 International Astronomical Union
 Planets beyond Neptune
 List of Solar System objects most distant from the Sun

Notes

References

External links 

 MPEC listing for Makemake
 AstDys orbital elements
 Orbital simulation from JPL (Java) / Ephemeris
 Press release from WHT and TNG on Makemake's similarity to Pluto.
 Makemake Sky Charts and Coordinates
 Precovery image with the 1.06 m Kleť Observatory telescope on April 20, 2003
 Makemake as seen on 2010-02-18 UT with the Keck 1
 Makemake of the Outer Solar System APOD July 15, 2008
 Simulation of Makemake's orbit

 
Classical Kuiper belt objects
Discoveries by Chad Trujillo
Discoveries by David L. Rabinowitz
Discoveries by Michael E. Brown
Named minor planets
136472
20050331
Dwarf planets